Gojčo or Gojslav was the Ban of Croatia from c.1060 to c.1070. He succeeded Stjepan Praska as ban. He was most likely the brother of king Peter Krešimir IV of Croatia, who was rumored to have murdered his brother Gojslav. He was succeeded by Zvonimir, who also later became king.

References

http://hrcak.srce.hr/file/121283

11th-century Croatian people
Bans of Croatia
11th-century rulers in Europe
11th-century Croatian nobility